Zograf may refer to:
Zograf Monastery, Bulgarian monastery on Mount Athos (Greece)
Saint George the Zograf, the icon of St. George in Zograf Monastery
Zograf Codex, a Gospel originating from Zograf Monastery
Zograf Peak, Antarctica
Zograf, Bulgaria, a village in Bulgaria
Zograf (surname)

See also
Zografos (disambiguation)
Zografou (disambiguation)